Noël Ritter Valis (born 24 December 1945) is a writer, scholar and translator. She is a Professor of Spanish at Yale University.

Biography
She was raised in Toms River, New Jersey and graduated from Toms River High School (now Toms River High School South) in 1964; she was inducted into the Toms River Regional Schools' Hall of Fame in 1995.

She received her B.A. from Douglass College (Rutgers University) and earned a Ph.D. in Spanish and French at Bryn Mawr College. An Hon. Woodrow Wilson Fellow, she is a recipient of fellowships from the John Simon Guggenheim Foundation and the National Endowment for the Humanities. Valis is a Full Member of the Academia Norteamericana de la Lengua Española (an affiliate of the Real Academia Española) and a Corresponding Member of the Real Academia Española. In 2017 she won the Victoria Urbano Academic Achievement Prize (Premio Victoria Urbano de Reconocimiento Académico), given by the International Association of Hispanic Women's Literature and Culture (Asociación Internacional de Literatura y Cultura Femenina Hispánica), for her work in Hispanic women's and gender studies.

Her research centers on modern Spanish literature, culture, and history. The Culture of Cursilería. Bad Taste, Kitsch, and Class in Modern Spain won the Modern Language Association's Katherine Singer Kovács Prize. Her translation of Noni Benegas's poetry, Burning Cartography, was awarded the New England Council of Latin American Studies' Best Book Translation Prize.  
She has also published a book of poetry, My House Remembers Me / Mi casa me recuerda, and a novella, The Labor of Longing, a Finalist for the Prize Americana for Prose and for the Next Generation Indie Book Awards in both the Novella and Regional Fiction categories.
 An interview with Host Laurence Sledak was recorded for Unwanted Artists on 11 March 2015 and released on 7 April 2015. It may be viewed on YouTube. 

She served as a member of the National Council on the Humanities, the advisory board to the Chairman of the National Endowment for the Humanities (2019-22).  In 2021, she was awarded the Cátedra Miguel Delibes/Miguel Delibes Chair and was also elected President of the Asociación Internacional de Galdosistas, the International Association of Galdós Scholars, for a three-year term.

Works

Literary/Cultural Criticism
 Lorca After Life (Yale University Press, 2022)
 Realismo sagrado. Religión e imaginación en la narrativa española moderna (Calambur, 2017)
 Reading Twentieth-Century Spanish Literature. Selected Essays (Juan de la Cuesta, 2016)
Sacred Realism. Religion and the Imagination in Modern Spanish Narrative (Yale University Press, 2010)
The Culture of Cursilería. Bad Taste, Kitsch, and Class in Modern Spain (Duke University Press, 2002; Spanish version: La cultura de la cursilería. Mal gusto, clase y kitsch en la España moderna, Antonio Machado Libros, 2010)
Reading the Nineteenth-Century Spanish Novel. Selected Essays (Juan de la Cuesta, 2005)
The Novels of Jacinto Octavio Picón (Bucknell University Press, 1986; Spanish version: Jacinto Octavio Picón, novelista, Anthropos, 1991)
The Decadent Vision in Leopoldo Alas. A Study of "La Regenta" and "Su único hijo" (Louisiana State University Press, 1981)

Edited volumes
El vicio color de rosa. By Álvaro Retana (Renacimiento, 2023)
 Serenata del amor triunfante. By Pedro Badanelli (Renacimiento, 2016)
 Teaching Representations of the Spanish Civil War (Modern Language Association, 2007)
In the Feminine Mode. Essays on Hispanic Women Writers (Bucknell University Press, 1990; 2nd ed., 1995) (co-ed. with Carol Maier)
Poesías. By Carolina Coronado (Castalia / Instituto de la Mujer, 1991)
 Bocetos al temple. By José María de Pereda. In Obras completas, Vol. 3 (Tantín, 1990)
 La hijastra del amor. By Jacinto Octavio Picón (PPU, 1990)
 "Malevolent Insemination" and Other Essays on Clarín (Michigan Romance Studies Series, vol. 10, 1990)

Fiction and poetry

The Labor of Longing. A Novella (Main Street Rag Publishing, 2014)
My House Remembers Me / Mi casa me recuerda. Poetry (Esquío, 2003)

Translations

 Two Confessions. Essays by María Zambrano and Rosa Chacel. Translated by Noël Valis and Carol Maier (SUNY Press, 2015; ppr, 2016)
Burning Cartography. Poetry by Noni Benegas (Host Publications, 2007; 2nd ed., 2011)
The Poetry of Sara Pujol Russell (Susquehanna University Press, 2005)
 The-Poetry-Julia-Uceda-Nuestra/dp/0820424099 The Poetry of Julia Uceda (Lang, 1995)
 Prelude to Pleasure. By Pedro Salinas. Trans. of Víspera del gozo (Bucknell University Press, 1993)
Las conjuradoras. Antología bilingüe de seis poetas norteamericanas de hoy (Esquío, 1993)

Bibliographies

 Leopoldo Alas (Clarín). An Annotated Bibliography. Supplement I (Boydell and Brewer/Tamesis, 2002)
 Leopoldo Alas (Clarín). An Annotated Bibliography (Grant & Cutler, 1986)

References

Justin Louis, "Toms River Native Releases Pine Barrens-Based Novella," Interview, WOBM Radio (Feb. 27, 2015)
¿Por qué España? Memorias del hispanismo estadounidense. Ed. Anna Caballé and Randolph Pope (Galaxia-Gutenberg, 2014), pp. 625–52.
José María Martínez Domingo, Reseña (Sacred Realism), Hipertexto 16 (Summer 2012), pp. 181–84.
Noël Valis, "On Writing in Two Languages and Other Intimacies," Ciberletras 20 (2008)
Carol Maier, "Prólogo / Prologue," in My House Remembers Me / Mi casa me recuerda (Esquío, 2003), pp. 9–24.
"Dos poetas de U.S.A.: Linda Gregg y Noël M. Valis," Peña Labra (Santander) No. 61 (Spring 1987), pp. 9–23.
Peio H. Riaño, "Éramos tan cursis," Público (Madrid) (12 April 2010)
Contemporary Authors, vol. 110 (Gale Research Co., 1984), pp. 509–10.

External links
Homepage (http://span-port.yale.edu/people/noel-valis) at Yale University
Unwantedartists interview with author Noël Valis
Noël Valis interview with Vaughn Radio, Madrid. March 10, 2015— part 1; part 2

Living people
1945 births
Yale University faculty
Rutgers University alumni
Bryn Mawr College alumni
Spanish–English translators
People from Toms River, New Jersey
Toms River High School South alumni